Following are the results of the 2007 Categoría Primera B season, for the second division football league in Colombia.  This was the 18th season since its founding, and was officially called the 2007 Copa Premier for sponsorship reasons.

Copa Premier I 1st Round

Copa Premier I Semifinals

Match summaries 
Copa Premier I Finals

Aggregated Score

Awards

Promotion/relegation playoff 
As the second worst team in the relegation table, Deportivo Pereira had to play a two-legged tie against Academia F.C., the 2007 Categoría Primera B runner-up. As the Primera A team, América will play the second leg at home. The winner will be determined by points, followed by goal difference, then a penalty shootout. The winner will be promoted/remain in the Primera A for the 2008 season, while the loser will be relegated/remain in the Primera B.

External links 
 Copa Mustang Official Page
 Dimayor Official Page

Categoría Primera B seasons
2007 in Colombian football
Colombia